The 1st Korfball World Championships was held in The Netherlands on November 6–11, in the cities of Assen, Nuenen, and Amsterdam

First round

Pool A

Second round

5th–8th places

7th–8th places

5th–6th places

Semi-finals

Bronze medal match

Final

Final standings

Korfball World Championship
Korfball World Championship
IKF World Korfball Championship
International sports competitions hosted by the Netherlands
Korfball in the Netherlands